Pehitia "Pehi" Te Whare (born 6 February 1984) is a former New Zealand rugby union player. He notably played for the Southland Stags in the National Provincial Championship. He mainly played the wing position. He is also a former New Zealand Māori representative, where he played in the Churchill Cup.

References

External links
Southland Player Profile

1984 births
Living people
Southland rugby union players
New Zealand rugby union players
Rugby union wings
Māori All Blacks players
People educated at Te Kuiti High School
Rugby union players from Waikato